Wellington Rocha dos Santos, known as  Wellington Rocha or Rocha inside Brazil (born 4 October 1990) is a Brazilian-born East Timorese football player who plays as a central defender. He last played for F.C. Gifu. He played for Timor-Leste national team.

International career
Naturalized citizen of East Timor, Rocha made his senior international debut on 5 October 2012 in a 2012 AFF Suzuki Cup qualification match against Cambodia national football team.

References

External links

1990 births
Living people
Footballers from São Paulo
Brazilian footballers
Brazilian emigrants to East Timor
East Timorese footballers
Timor-Leste international footballers
Brazilian expatriate footballers
East Timorese expatriate footballers
Association football defenders
Marília Atlético Clube players
Associação Ferroviária de Esportes players
Expatriate footballers in Thailand
Expatriate footballers in Indonesia
Expatriate footballers in Japan
Indonesian Premier Division players
PSIR Rembang players
J2 League players
FC Gifu players